Cannery Women, Cannery Lives: Mexican Women, Unionization, and the California Food Processing Industry, 1930-1950 is a 1987 monograph by Vicki L. Ruiz published by the University of New Mexico Press.

Synopsis
Cannery Women, Cannery Lives tells the history of Mexican and Mexican-American women working in the California canning and food processing industry and their involvement in labor organization and unionization during 19301950. Ruiz combines a variety of sources, government records, newspaper articles, union documents, and oral histories to tell the story of how Mexican American women shaped the canning and food processing industry and unionization in California and how the industry in turn impacted their lives, families and communities.

The book is divided into six chapters. The first two chapters discuss the details of the work, family, and community lives of the women working in the industry; the role of family and kinship connections form an important theme in the work. 
Chapters 35 focus on the United Cannery, Agricultural, Packing, and Allied Workers of America (UCAPAWA), a loosely organized labor union created in 1937, and how it developed and influenced the California food packing industry and the roles Mexican women in the cannery industry played in its organization, development, and leadership. The final chapter discusses the competition between the UCAPAWA and the more centrally organized Teamsters and its eventual decline and absorption into the Distributive and Processing Workers of America.

Academic journal reviews

Release information
 Hardcover: 1987 (First Edition), University of New Mexico Press, pp.194 .
 Paperback: 1987, University of New Mexico Press, pp.212 .

About the author
 
Vicki L. Ruiz is a historian and professor focusing on the lives of Mexican American women in the 20th century. Ruiz has served as president of the American Historical Association, the American Studies Association, the Berkshire Conference of Women Historians, and the Organization of American Historians. In 2015 she was inducted into the American Academy of Arts and Sciences and was awarded the National Humanities Medal.

See also
 Becoming Mexican American: Ethnicity, Culture, and Identity in Chicano Los Angeles, 1900-1945

References

Notes

Citations

External links
 Interview with Vicki Ruiz, Chicano/Latino Studies and History Distinguished Professor, UC Irvine; University of California, Irvine.
 Why Latino/a History Matters to U.S. History: A lecture by Dr. Vicki Ruiz; Woodrow Wilson Center.

Books about Los Angeles
Books about California